Roosevelt Community Church, formerly First Church of Christ, Scientist, Phoenix, is an historic church building located at 924 North First Street, in Phoenix, Arizona. On August 10, 1993, it was added to the National Register of Historic Places. The previous First Church congregation now holds services at 830 North Central Avenue.

See also
 List of Registered Historic Places in Arizona
 List of former Christian Science churches, societies and buildings
 First Church of Christ, Scientist (disambiguation)

References

External links

 Downtown Phoenix Journal: 924 N 1st. St
 National Register listing
 Roosevelt Community Church website
 First Church of Christ, Scientist, Phoenix website

Churches in Phoenix, Arizona
Christian Science churches in Arizona
Former Christian Science churches, societies and buildings in the United States
National Register of Historic Places in Phoenix, Arizona
Churches on the National Register of Historic Places in Arizona
Churches completed in 1925
20th-century Christian Science church buildings
Neoclassical architecture in Arizona